Dupas may refer to:

 Alain Dupas (1945–2022), French astronomer and astrophysicist
 Benjamin Dupas, co-creator of the TV series Vampires
 Jean Dupas (1882–1964), French painter
 Pascaline Dupas, French economist
 Peter Dupas (born 1953), Australian convicted serial killer
 Pierre-Louis Dupas (1761–1823), French soldier
 Ralph Dupas (1935–2008), American boxer

Other 
 Île-Dupas, an island of La Visitation-de-l'Île-Dupas, Quebec

See also
 Dubas (disambiguation)

French-language surnames